HC Tábor is an ice hockey team in Tábor, Czech Republic. They play in the Czech 2.liga, the third level of ice hockey in the Czech Republic. The club was founded in 1921.

Achievements
Czech 2.liga (West) champion: 2009.

External links
 Official site

Ice hockey teams in the Czech Republic
Sport in Tábor
1921 establishments in Czechoslovakia
Ice hockey teams in Czechoslovakia
Ice hockey clubs established in 1921